The Slochd Summit is a mountain pass on the A9 road and the Highland Main Line Railway in the Scottish Highlands between Inverness and Aviemore.  An old military road also goes through the pass.  National Cycle Network route 7 also goes over the summit, largely following the old A9.

References

Mountain passes of Scotland
Roads in Scotland
Transport in Highland (council area)
Railway inclines in the United Kingdom